The 1989–90 Czechoslovak Extraliga season was the 47th season of the Czechoslovak Extraliga, the top level of ice hockey in Czechoslovakia. 12 teams participated in the league, and Sparta CKD Prag won the championship.

Regular season

Playoffs

Quarterfinal
Dukla Jihlava – CHZ Litvínov 6:2 (0:1,3:0,3:1)
CHZ Litvínov – Dukla Jihlava 6:2 (2:0,2:2,2:0)
Dukla Jihlava – CHZ Litvínov 3:5 (1:3,2:1,0:1)
VSŽ Košice – Poldi Kladno 1:2 (0:0,0:1,1:1)
Poldi Kladno – VSŽ Košice 5:3 (1:1,2:2,2:0)
Dukla Trenčín – TJ Gottwaldov/SK Zlín 4:3 SN (0:0,1:2,2:1,0:0)
TJ Gottwaldov/SK Zlín – Dukla Trenčín 2:3 (0:2,0:1,2:0)
Sparta Praha – TJ Vítkovice 2:0 (2:0,0:0,0:0)
TJ Vítkovice – Sparta Praha 4:6 (2:2,0:1,2:3)

Semifinal 
Dukla Trenčín – CHZ Litvínov 5:4 SN (4:1,0:0,0:3.0:0)
Dukla Trenčín – CHZ Litvínov 7:2 (2:1,3:1,2:0)
CHZ Litvínov – Dukla Trenčín 3:7 (1:4,0:1,2:2)
Sparta Praha – Poldi Kladno 5:1 (1:1,2:0,2:0)
Sparta Praha – Poldi Kladno 3:4 (2:1,0:1,1:2)
Poldi Kladno – Sparta Praha 2:5 (1:1,0:1,1:3)
Poldi Kladno – Sparta Praha 5:2 (1:1,0:1,4:0)
Sparta Praha – Poldi Kladno 4:1 (1:0,1:0,2:1)

Final 
Dukla Trenčín – Sparta Praha 1:5 (1:1,0:1,0:3)
Dukla Trenčín – Sparta Praha 2:4 (2:1,0:1,0:2)
Sparta Praha – Dukla Trenčín 0:2 (0:0,0:2,0:0)
Sparta Praha – Dukla Trenčín 7:1 (0:0,2:1,5:0)

Placing round 
 5th–8th place
Dukla Jihlava – TJ Gottwaldov/SK Zlín 6:2 (0:0,3:1,3:1)
TJ Gottwaldov/SK Zlín – Dukla Jihlava 2:6 (1:4,0:1,1:1)
VSŽ Košice – TJ Vítkovice 10:6 (5:1,2:4,3:1)
TJ Vítkovice – VSŽ Košice 11:3 (4:1,4:0,3:2)
VSŽ Košice – TJ Vítkovice 7:2 (2:0,3:2,2:0)
 9th place
Motor České Budějovice – Škoda Plzeň 6:3 (1:1,3:1,2:1)
Motor České Budějovice – Škoda Plzeň 4:5 (1:2,2:1,1:2)
Škoda Plzeň – Motor České Budějovice 3:4 (2:2,1:1,0:1)
Škoda Plzeň – Motor České Budějovice 9:4 (2:2,1:0,6:2)
Motor České Budějovice – Škoda Plzeň 6:4 (3:1,0:2,3:1)
 7th place
TJ Vítkovice – TJ Gottwaldov/SK Zlín 5:8 (1:2,1:5,3:1)
TJ Gottwaldov/SK Zlín – TJ Vítkovice 5:9 (1:2,2:6,2:1)
TJ Vítkovice – TJ Gottwaldov/SK Zlín 5:4 PP (1:2,0:1,3:1,1:0)
5th place
Dukla Jihlava – VSŽ Košice 3:5 (0:2,1:3,2:0)
VSŽ Košice – Dukla Jihlava 5:3 (1:0,2:3,2:0)
3rd place
Poldi Kladno – CHZ Litvínov 1:3 (0:2,1:0,0:1)
CHZ Litvínov – Poldi Kladno 5:4 (1:2,0:1,4:1)

1. Liga-Qualification

External links
History of Czechoslovak ice hockey

Czechoslovak Extraliga seasons
Czechoslovak
1989–90 in Czechoslovak ice hockey